The Mahaweli River (literally "Great Sandy River";  [mahawali gangai]), is a  long river, ranking as the longest river in Sri Lanka. The real beginning of Mahaweli Ganga starts at Polwathura (at Mahawila area), a remote village of Nuwara-Eliya District in bank Nawalapitiya of Kandy District by further joining of Hatton Oya and Kotmale Oya. The river reaches the Bay of Bengal on the southwestern side of Trincomalee Bay. The bay includes the first of a number submarine canyons, making Trincomalee one of the finest natural deep-sea harbours in the world.

As part of Mahaweli Development programme the river and its tributaries are dammed at several locations to allow irrigation in the dry zone, with almost  of land irrigated. Production of hydroelectricity from six dams of the Mahaweli system supplies more than 40% of Sri Lanka's electricity needs.  One of the many sources of the river is the Kotmale Oya.

There is a misconception in Sri Lanka that the Mahaweli starts in the Sri Pada mountain. The Mahaweli gets its source waters from Horton Plains in Kirigalpoththa and the Thotupola mountain range.

Tributaries 

 Nanu Oya
 Puna Oya
 Pundalu Oya
 Kotmale Oya
 Hatton Oya
 Nilamba Oya
 Thalathu Oya
 Hulu Ganga
 Beli Ul Oya
 Kirindi Oya
 Loggal Oya
 Uma Oya
 Badulu Oya
 Amban Ganga

Starting of Mahaweli 
The Mahaweli River starts from Polwathura/Mahavila area with its water source starting from the Horton Plains National Park.

See also 
 List of rivers in Sri Lanka
 Mahaweli Development programme

References

External links 
 Mahaweli River The Lifeline of Sri Lanka

Rivers of Sri Lanka